Pterostylis dubia, commonly known as the blue-tongued greenhood, is a plant in the orchid family Orchidaceae and is endemic to Tasmania. It has a rosette of fleshy leaves at its base and a dark green and white flower with narrow petals and a dark blue-green labellum.

Description
Pterostylis dubia, is a terrestrial,  perennial, deciduous, herb with an underground tuber. The dorsal sepal and petals are joined, forming a hood called the "galea" over the column. The petals are not flared and are similar in length to the dorsal sepal which ends in a point. There is a wide gap at each side of the flower between the galea and the lateral sepals. Flowering occurs from November to January.

Taxonomy and naming
Pterostylis dubia was first formally described in 1810 by Robert Brown and the description was published in Prodromus Florae Novae Hollandiae et Insulae Van Diemen. The specific epithet (dubia) is a Latin word meaning "wavering", "uncertain" or "doubtful".

Distribution and habitat
The blue-tongued greenhood grows in wet forest at altitudes above  in central and southern Tasmania.

References

dubia
Orchids of Tasmania
Plants described in 1810